The Legislative Yuan is the unicameral legislature of the Republic of China (Taiwan) located in Taipei. The Legislative Yuan is composed of 113 members, who are directly elected for 4-year terms by people of the Taiwan Area through a parallel voting system.

Originally located in Nanking, the Legislative Yuan, along with the National Assembly (electoral college) and the Control Yuan (upper house), formed the tricameral parliament under the original 1947 Constitution. The Legislative Yuan previously had 759 members representing each constituencies of all provinces, municipalities, Tibet, Outer Mongolia and various professions.

Until democratization, the Republic of China was an authoritarian state under Dang Guo, the Legislative Yuan had alternatively been characterized as a rubber stamp for the then-ruling regime of the Kuomintang. 

Like parliaments or congresses of other countries, the Legislative Yuan is responsible for the passage of legislation, which is then sent to the President for signing. For these similarities, it is also common for people to refer to the Legislative Yuan as "the parliament".

Under the current amended Constitution and in accordance with the separation of powers, the Legislative Yuan, as the only parliamentary body, also holds the power to initiate several constitutional processes, including initiating constitutional amendments (then determined by a national referendum), recalls of the President (then determined by a recall vote), and impeachments of the President (then tried by the Constitutional Court).

Composition

Legislators

Starting with the 2008 legislative elections, changes were made to the Legislative Yuan in accordance with a constitutional amendment passed in 2005. The Legislative Yuan has 113 members serving four-year terms. 73 members are elected by first-past-the-post, 6 reserved for indigenous candidates by single non-transferable vote, and 34 by party-list proportional representation. The current Legislative Yuan was inaugurated on February 1, 2020 and its term expires on January 31, 2024.

The 5 largest parties with 3 seats or more can form caucuses. If there are fewer than 5 such parties, legislators in other parties or with no party affiliation can form caucuses with at least 4 members.

Leadership

The President and Vice President of the Legislative Yuan are elected by the 113 legislators during a preparatory session in the beginning of their 4-year terms. President and Vice President of the Legislative Yuan sometimes translate to speaker and deputy speaker respectively in English.

Functions

Powers
Like parliaments or congresses of other countries, the Legislative Yuan holds the following power according to the current amended Constitution
 make laws and approve national budget, treaties, and emergency decrees issued by the President
 review executive decrees
 interpellation of government officials
 initiate no-confidence votes against the Executive Yuan
 approve appointments to the Examination Yuan, the Control Yuan, the Grand Justices, the Auditor General, the Public Prosecutor General, the National Communications Commission, the Fair Trade Commission and the Central Election Commission,
 initiate the recall of the President or the Vice President, and the impeachment of the President or the Vice President
 initiate constitutional amendments, which must be referred to a referendum

Other governmental organs are authorized to propose legislative bills to the Legislative Yuan. Legislative bills proposed to the Legislative Yuan have to be cosigned by a certain number of legislators. Once a bill reaches the legislature, it is subject to a process of three readings.

Committees
 Standing Committees
 Internal Administration Committee
 Social Welfare and Environmental Hygiene Committee
 Judiciary and Organic Laws and Statutes Committee
 Transportation Committee
 Education and Culture Committee
 Finance Committee
 Economics Committee
 Foreign and National Defense Committee
 Ad Hoc Committees
 Procedure Committee
 Expenditure Examination Committee
 Constitutional Amendment Committee
 Discipline Committee

History

Constitutional theory

The concept of Legislative Yuan was introduced by Sun Yat-sen's Three Principles of the People. The theory proposed a separation of powers into five branches. The Legislative Yuan, under Sun's political theory, is a branch of government elected by the National Assembly that serves as the standing legislative body when the National Assembly is not in session.

The legislators are to be elected through direct elections. In the constitution, Legislative Yuan, together with National Assembly and Control Yuan, form three chambers of a tricameral parliament according to the Judicial Yuan's interpretation number 76 of the Constitution (1957).

However, the later constitutional amendments in the 1990s removed the parliamentary roles from National Assembly and Control Yuan and transferred them to the Legislative Yuan, which became an unicameral parliament.

Establishment and relocation to Taiwan

The original Legislative Yuan was formed in the original capital of Nanking after the completion of the Northern Expedition. Its 51 members were appointed to a term of two years. The 4th Legislative Yuan under this period had its members expanded to 194, and its term in office was extended to 14 years because of the Second Sino-Japanese War (1937–45). According to KMT political theory, these first four sessions marked the period of political tutelage.

The current Constitution of the Republic of China came into effect on 25 December 1947, and the first Legislative session convened in Nanking on 18 May 1948, with 760 members. Six preparatory meetings had been held on 8 May 1948, during which Sun Fo and Chen Li-fu were elected president and vice president of the body. In 1949, the mainland fell to the Communist Party and the Legislative Yuan (along with the entire ROC government) was transplanted to Taipei. On 24 February 1950, 380 members convened at the Sun Yat-sen Hall in Taipei.

The first Legislative Yuan was to have been elected for a term of three years ending in 1951; however, the fall of mainland China made it impossible to hold new elections. As a result, the Judicial Yuan decided that the members of the Legislative Yuan would continue to hold office until new elections could be held on the Mainland.  This decision was made in the belief that the KMT would retake the Mainland in a short time.  However, over the years, as the prospect of regaining the Mainland diminished, this meant that the legislators from mainland districts (and members of the ruling KMT) held their seats for life, in a one-party system. The body thus came to be called "the Non-reelected Congress".

Over the years, deceased members elected on the mainland were not replaced while additional seats were created for Taiwan starting with eleven seats in 1969.  Fifty-one new members were elected to a three-year term in 1972, fifty-two in 1975, ninety-seven in 1980, ninety-eight in 1983, one hundred in 1986, and one hundred thirty in 1989. Although the elected members of the Legislative Yuan did not have the majority to defeat legislation, they were able to use the Legislative Yuan as a platform to express political dissent. Opposition parties were formally illegal until 1991, but in the 1970s candidates to the Legislative Yuan would run as Tangwai ("outside the party"), and in 1985 candidates began to run under the banner of the Democratic Progressive Party.

Democratization
The members of the Legislative Yuan with extended terms remained until 31 December 1991, when as part of subsequent Judicial Yuan ruling they were forced to retire and the members elected in 1989 remained until the 161 members of the Second Legislative Yuan were elected in December 1992.  The third LY, elected in 1995, had 157 members serving 3-year terms. The fourth LY, elected in 1998, was expanded to 225 members in part to include legislators from the abolished provincial legislature of Taiwan Province.
The Legislative Yuan greatly increased its prominence after the 2000 Presidential elections in Taiwan when the Executive Yuan and presidency was controlled by the Democratic Progressive Party while the Legislative Yuan had a large majority of Kuomintang members.  The legislative elections in late 2001 produced a contentious situation in which the pan-blue coalition has only a thin majority over the governing pan-green coalition in the legislature, making the passage of bills often dependent on the votes of a few defectors and independents.  Because of the party situation there have been constitutional conflicts between the Legislative Yuan and the executive branch over the process of appointment for the premier and whether the president has the power to call a special session.

Amid 70% public support, the Legislative Yuan voted 217–1 on 23 August 2004 for a package of amendments to:
 Halve the number of seats from 225 to 113
 Switch to a single-member district parallel voting electoral system
 Increase the terms of members from 3 to 4 years, to synchronize the legislative and presidential elections. (The change was implemented for the next election cycle, as the legislative election was held in January 2008, and the presidential election followed in March.)

The new electoral system installed in 2008 includes 73 plurality seats (one for each electoral district), 6 seats for aboriginals, with the remaining 34 seats to be filled from party lists. Every county has a minimum of 1 electoral district, thereby guaranteed at least one seat in the legislature, while half of the proportionally represented seats drawn from party lists must be women.

Additionally, the Legislative Yuan proposed to abolish the National Assembly. Future amendments would still be proposed by the LY by a three-fourths vote from a quorum of at least three-fourths of all members of the Legislature.  After a mandatory 180-day promulgation period, the amendment would have to be ratified by an absolute majority of all eligible voters of the ROC irrespective of voter turnout.  The latter requirement would allow a party to kill a referendum proposal by asking that their voters boycott the vote as was done by the KMT with the referendums associated with the 2004 Presidential Election.

A DPP proposal to allow the citizens the right to initiate constitutional referendums was pulled off the table, due to a lack of support. The proposal was criticized for dangerously lowering the threshold for considering a constitutional amendment. Whereas a three-fourths vote of the LY would require that any proposed constitutional amendment have a broad political consensus behind it, a citizen's initiative would allow a fraction of the electorate to force a constitutional referendum. It was feared that allowing this to occur would result in a referendum on Taiwan independence which would likely result in a crisis with the People's Republic of China.

The Legislative Yuan also proposed to give itself the power to summon the president for an annual "state of the nation" address and launch a recall of the president and vice president (proposed by one fourth and approved by two thirds of the legislators and be submitted to a nationwide referendum for approval or rejection by majority vote). The Legislative Yuan will also have the power to propose the impeachment of the president or vice president to the Council of Grand Justices.

An ad hoc National Assembly was elected and formed in 2005 to ratify the amendments. The downsized Legislative Yuan took effect after the 2008 elections.

On 20 July 2007, the Legislative Yuan passed a Lobbying Act.

Elections and terms

The Kuomintang-led government of the Republic of China retreated to Taiwan in 1949, the year following the first legislative elections (1948) after the enactment of the 1947 constitution. As the Kuomintang government continues to claim sovereignty over Mainland China, the term of the original legislators was extended until "re-election is possible in their original electoral districts." In response to the increasing democracy movement in Taiwan, limited supplementary elections were held in Taiwan starting from 1969 and parts of Fujian from 1972. Legislators elected in these supplementary elections served together with those who were elected in 1948. This situation remained until a Constitutional Court (Judicial Yuan) ruling on 21 June 1991 that ordered the retirement of all members with extended terms by the end of 1991.

Timeline of Legislative Yuan elections and terms

The legislature had 225 members during the 4th, 5th, and 6th terms. Legislators were elected as follows:
 168 were elected by popular vote through single non-transferable vote in multi-member consistencies.
 41 were elected on the basis of the proportion of nationwide votes received by participating political parties.
 8 were allocated for overseas citizens and were selected by the parties on the basis of the proportion of votes received nationwide.
 8 seats were reserved for the indigenous populations.

Since the 7th term, the 113 legislators are elected to office as follows:
73 are elected under the first-past-the-post system in single-member constituencies.
34 are elected under the supplementary member system on a second ballot, based on nationwide votes, and calculated using the largest remainder method by the Hare quota. Any party which receives 5% or more of the party vote can enter the parliament. For each party, at least half of the legislators elected under this system must be female.
6 seats are elected by indigenous voters through single non-transferable vote in two three-member constituencies.

Composition by term 
The Kuomintang (KMT) held a supermajority of seats in the Legislative Yuan between 1948 and 1991, while some seats were held by the Chinese Youth Party (CYP) and the China Democratic Socialist Party (CDSP). Through the limited supplementary elections held in since the 1970s, the Tangwai movement saw their share of seats increase. Most members in the Tangwai movement joined the Democratic Progressive Party (DPP) after its founding in the late 1980s.

Issues

Protests and occupation

On 18 March 2014, the Legislative Yuan was occupied by protesting students.

Legislative violence
Much of the work of the Legislative Yuan is done via legislative committees, and a common sight on Taiwanese television involves officials of the executive branch answering extremely hostile questions from opposition members in committees. In the 1990s, there were a number of cases of violence breaking out on the floor, usually triggered by some perceived unfair procedure ruling, but in recent years, these have become less common. There was a brawl involving 50 legislators in January 2007 and an incident involving 40 legislators on 8 May 2007 when a speaker attempted to speak about reconfiguring the Central Election Committee. It has been alleged that fights are staged and planned in advance. These antics led the scientific humor magazine Annals of Improbable Research to award the Legislative Yuan its Ig Nobel Peace Prize in 1995 "for demonstrating that politicians gain more by punching, kicking and gouging each other than by waging war against other nations". On 29 June 2020 more than 20 lawmakers affiliated with the Kuomintang took over the legislature over night, blocking entry to the main chamber with chains and chairs, saying the government was trying to force through legislation and demanding the president withdraw the nomination of a close aide to a high-level watchdog. Democratic Progressive Party lawmakers forced themselves in while there were scuffles and shouting with Kuomintang lawmakers.

Building 
The current Legislative Yuan building in Taipei, was formerly the  constructed during the Japanese colonial rule since 1960 with the administrative offices previously a dormitory. Over the years, there were several proposals to relocate the Legislative Yuan. The 1990 proposal to move the legislature to the location of the defunct Huashan station, was passed in 1992, then abandoned after the budget was cut. A second proposal in 1999 suggested that the legislature move to what had previously served as Air Force Command Headquarters. This proposition was opposed by the Taipei City Council and funds for disaster relief became a priority after the Jiji earthquake. Other relocation proposals include moving the parliament to Taichung, New Taipei, Changhua County, or Yilan County. In 2022, graduate students from several Taiwanese universities were invited to submit designs for a new building.

Gallery

See also

 10th Legislative Yuan
 Politics of the Republic of China
 History of the Republic of China
 Legislative violence

Notes

References

External links 

 

 
Taiwan
Taiwan
Taiwanese Members of the Legislative Yuan
1928 establishments in China
1945 establishments in Taiwan